Hans Vogel (16 February 1881 – 6 October 1945) was a German politician and chairman of the Social Democratic Party of Germany (SPD) along with Arthur Crispien and Otto Wels from 1931 to 1933. After the NSDAP came to power in 1933, he became one of the leaders of the social democratic exile organization Sopade.

After attending the Volkshochschule in Fürth, Vogel, the son of a merchant and shoemaker, completed an apprenticeship as a wood sculptor assistant in 1897. He joined the trade union for wood sculptors as early as 1897 and worked in various parts of Germany. He was board member of a Social Democratic electoral association in Fürth from 1907 to 1911. From 1908, Vogel worked as secretary of the party in the region of Franconia. From 1912 to 1918 he was a member of the Bavarian Landtag. He supported the Burgfrieden politics of his party, i.e. support for the German war effort and giving up the anti-militarist stance at the beginning of World War I, because he viewed this as his patriotic duty. He served in World War I as a radio operator in the 105th Division.

After the war and the German Revolution, Vogel was a member of the German National Assembly, which composed the Weimar Constitution. He remained a member of the Reichstag until June 1933. After becoming a member of the caucus of the SPD in 1920, he was elected secretary of the party in 1927. In 1931, he became chairman along with Arthur Crispien and Otto Wels.

After the Machtergreifung in January 1933, Vogel first went to Saarbrücken, because it was administrated by the League of Nations at that time, and then on 2 June he moved on to Prague. In 1938 he moved to Paris and there he helped build up the Sopade, of which he was the sole chairman after Wels's death in 1939.

His death in October 1945 meant that he was not able to help with re-building the SPD. Hans-Vogel-Straße, a street in Fürth, is named after him.

See also 
 Union of German Socialist Organisations in Great Britain

References 

1881 births
1945 deaths
People from Nürnberger Land
People from the Kingdom of Bavaria
Social Democratic Party of Germany politicians
German Army personnel of World War I
Members of the Weimar National Assembly
Members of the Reichstag of the Weimar Republic
Members of the Bavarian Chamber of Deputies
Members of the Executive of the Labour and Socialist International